Nikolai Mikhailovich Bukhvostov was a Russian Captain 1st Rank and war hero of the Russo-Japanese War. He commanded the Imperator Aleksandr III throughout the war before ultimately being killed during the sinking of the ship at the Battle of Tsushima.

Biography
Born as the son of Mikhail Vasilievich Bukhvostov and Pavel Ivanovna Bukhvostova, Nikolai was a descendant of Sergei Bukhvostov (1659-1728) who was known as the "First Russian Soldier". On September 12, 1873, he was admitted into the Naval Cadet Corps before entering into active service on May 1, 1874. He was promoted to Gardemarin on April 30, 1877 before being assigned to the 4th Naval Crew on May 20, 1877 and promoted to Michman in August 20, 1878. On November 30, 1878, he was seconded to the Guards Naval Crew and transferred to it by November 26, 1879. He was finally given command of the Halibut on March 13, 1880 as well as command of the Canary on March 27, 1881 and promoted to Leytenant on January 1, 1883. He was temporarily part of the Chief of Staff of the Guards Naval Crew and from August 15 to September 1, 1886, he commanded the Teterev and the Rynda from April 21, 1891 to April 23, 1892.

Bukhvostov was then given command of a company of lower ranked staff at Kronstadt before being the Wreed commander of the 1st engine company from January 23 to May 23, 1894. On February 18, 1894, he was made the Senior officer of the yacht Arrow of His Imperial Majesty. From September 24, 1894 to February 8, 1897, he was the Senior officer of the Rynda and promoted to 2nd Rank Captain on December 6, 1894. He was made a member of the commission for the admission of recruits to the Baltic Fleet on September 20, 1896 before going on a business trip on the Black Sea-Azov to combat a plague outbreak from February 21 to June 9, 1897. Duke Alexander of Oldenburg then gave Bukhvostov command of ports on the Black Sea from June 17 to August 15, 1897 as well as given command of the Onega on December 6, 1897. Bukhvostov proceeded to go on another business trip on the Black Sea coast to check the inventory of quarantine institutions and observation stations from February 4 to March 12, 1896. He was given command of the Rynda again from December 15, 1898 to December 7, 1902.

On March 8, 1902, he was commissioned by  before going to Saigon on December 4, 1902 to receive the 
Admiral Nakhimov and promoted to Captain 1st Rank on December 6, 1902. He commanded the cruiser from January 17 to September 8, 1903 before being commissioned by Rear-Admiral Konstantin Nikonov to test the Imperator Aleksandr III before given command of the battleship on September 18, 1903. During the Russo-Japanese War, before the departure of the 2nd Pacific Squadron from Kronstadt, he uttered prophetic words: "We will all die, but we will not surrender." During the Battle of Tsushima, the Imperator Aleksandr III was sunk. Of the 867 crew members, not a single person escaped along with Bukhvostov himself.

Awards
Order of Saint Stanislaus, III Class (January 1, 1889)
Order of Saint Anna, III Class (January 1, 1894)
 (March 2, 1896)
Order of Saint Stanislaus, II Class (March 1, 1898)
Order of Saint Anna, II Class (December 6, 1902)
Order of Saint Vladimir, IV Class (December 27, 1903)

Foreign Awards
: Legion of Honor, Knight (November 22, 1893)
: Order of the Red Eagle, IV Class (July 25, 1888)
: House Order of the Wendish Crown, IV Class (August 25, 1894)
 Portugal: Military Order of Aviz, Commander's Cross (November 29. 1903)

References

1857 births
1905 deaths
People from Pskov Oblast
Imperial Russian Navy officers
Russian military personnel of the Russo-Japanese War
Russian military personnel killed in the Russo-Japanese War
People from Pskov Governorate
Recipients of the Order of St. Anna, 2nd class
Recipients of the Order of St. Anna, 3rd class
Recipients of the Order of Saint Stanislaus (Russian), 2nd class
Recipients of the Order of Saint Stanislaus (Russian), 3rd class
Recipients of the Order of St. Vladimir, 4th class
Chevaliers of the Légion d'honneur
Commanders of the Order of Aviz
Naval Cadet Corps alumni